
Grosvenor Rowing Club is based on the Groves in Chester. It rows on the River Dee and has around 30 km of rowable river, much of which straight and broad.

The club colours are dark blue 
and orange.

History

The club names its eights (8+s) after members of the family. The club was formed in 1869 to enable the less fortunate people of Chester to take up the sport of rowing. The club's crest states "Virtus non stemma" which translates to "Valor, not garland" or "Virtue, not pedigree" derived from the motto of the Duke of Westminster's  Eaton Hall home (hist. Earl Grosvenor) which is their surname, which is further up the Dee. The motto also sums up the open membership of the club since its inauguration; originally contrasting to the closed membership of Royal Chester Rowing Club which was traditionally home to the alumni of the "public" independent King's School, Chester. Today the rivalry is sporting rather than based on social class as both clubs have completely open membership policies.

In 2019 the club celebrated its 150th anniversary and were honoured to be granted a row-past by Sir Steve Redgrave on the Saturday lunchtime of Henley Royal Regatta.

Recent results

In 2019 (the club's 150 year) Lucy Iball, in the Aspirational Single Sculls (A1x), won the Bernard Churcher Trophy at Henley Women's Regatta. She also became the club's first-ever women's sculler to qualify for Henley Royal Regatta in the Princess Royal Challenge Cup

2014 saw the Grosvenor senior women's intermediate club fours win The Lester Trophy at Henley Women's Regatta.

Grosvenor's men's 1st VIII/8+ finished 14th at the 2008 Head of the River Race after starting 153rd, beaten narrowly to the Jackson Trophy (One of three regional cups, namely for British non-tideway, non-Thames basin clubs) by 5 seconds by Agecroft Rowing Club, Manchester who finished 11th. The latter boat was seeded in 37th place which can provide flatter water.

In 2008 the men's 1st 8+ reached the quarter finals of the Thames Challenge Cup at Henley Royal Regatta emulating the club's successes at the 2007 regatta.

In 2007 Grosvenor's Coxless Four (4-) which reached the semi-finals at Henley Royal Regatta in the Wyfold Challenge Cup. They beat London 'D', Reading and Sydney before knocked out by eventual winners 1829 Boat Club which is the name used for composites of CUBC and OUBC alumni clubs/divisions Crabtree BC and Bosporos RC.

Honours

British champions

See also
British Rowing, the governing body.

References

External links
 http://grosvenor-rowingclub.org.uk/

Rowing clubs in England
Sport in Chester
Sports clubs established in 1869
1869 establishments in England
Rowing clubs of the River Dee